Steven Wolfe (born December 31, 1978), known professionally as Johnny Sins, is an American pornographic actor, director, and YouTuber. Sins is known for his shaved head and muscular physique. He is consistently among the most popular male talent pornography searches. He has received many accolades for his work, including three AVN Awards for Male Performer of the Year nominations as well as multiple nominations. Sins has also been the subject of many memes across social media.

Early life
Sins was born Steven Wolfe in Pittsburgh, Pennsylvania, on December 31, 1978. He has described himself as "very shy" while growing up. After graduating from the Indiana University of Pennsylvania, he got a job working six days a week in construction. He noticed the early signs of male pattern baldness when he was around 24 years old, and has kept his head shaved ever since. In 2006, at the age of 28, he quit his job and moved to Los Angeles to pursue the pornographic film industry full time.

Career

Sins' first pornographic endeavors were through Craigslist ads. Brazzers has described him as a "go-to guy" for the studio, having performed in 1,054 scenes as of April 1, 2019. He performed in about 2,300 videos in his career as a pornographic actor.

On June 10, 2015, Pornhub launched a crowdfunding campaign through Indiegogo to produce the first adult film in space. Sins and fellow actress Eva Lovia were slated to perform in the film. If the project were successfully funded, the two would have received six months of rigorous preparation for the launch, including zero gravity, velocity, and temperature training. When asked about the opportunity, Sins said, "It's beyond just doing it for the money, or the money shot for that matter. It's about making history." The campaign raised $236,086 over 60 days, failing to reach its goal of $3.4 million.

In early 2017, Sins and pornographic actress Kissa Sins (his then-wife) launched their YouTube channel SinsTV, which chronicles their day-to-day lives and features sex advice. As of May 2021, the channel has accrued 1.73 million subscribers. A video of Sins trying out various Turkish snacks briefly became the top YouTube video in Turkey.

In July 2018, images of Sins alongside several other porn stars were painted on the side of a bus that traveled around Kerala in India. The mural was part of a marketing campaign aimed to boost college tour rides. Later that year, Sins received the award for Most Popular Male Performer by Women at the annual Pornhub Awards, for which winners were determined by users' streaming data.

As of mid-2020, Sins has stopped making porn videos for large scale studios but continues to produce content under his own production company. He has stated that he may return to working for the large studios in the future.

Personal life
Sins currently resides in Las Vegas. He was previously married to pornographic actress Kissa Sins. They separated in 2019, but remain close friends.

In October 2017, a picture of Sins was tweeted by a user claiming he was missing after the Las Vegas shooting. The tweet was one of many viral hoaxes that emerged related to the shooting.

Awards and nominations

References

External links
 
 
 

1978 births
21st-century American male actors
American male pornographic film actors
American pornographic film directors
American pornographic film producers
American YouTubers
Indiana University of Pennsylvania alumni
Internet memes
Living people
Male actors from Pittsburgh
Male adult models
Male bloggers
Male models from Pennsylvania
Video bloggers